Francesco Poli (born 1949, Turin, Italy) is an Italian art critic and curator. He teaches History of Contemporary Art at the Academy of Fine Arts of Brera (Milan, Italy). He is also "chargé de cours" at University of Paris 8 and teaches Art and Communication at the University of Turin.

Poli writes regularly for several art journals and magazines, including Tema Celeste, and for the daily newspaper La Stampa; He also worked as the art critic for the Italian newspaper Il Manifesto, focusing primarily on 20th century art.

Publications
Produzione artistica e mercato, Einaudi, Turin, 1975
L’arte bella, Feltrinelli, Milan 1979 (with Luciano Caramel)
La Metafisica, Laterza, Milan 1989 (reprinted and expanded in 2004)
Giulio Paolini, Lindau, Turin, 1990
Dizionario di arte contemporanea (with Martina Corgnati), Feltrinelli, Milan, 1994
Minimalismo, Arte Povera, Arte Concettuale, Laterza, Rome, 1995 (VIII edition 2009)
Catalogo generale delle opere di Felice Casorati. I dipinti, (with Giorgina Bertolino), 2 vol.,  Allemandi, Turin, 1996   (II edition in 3 books,  2004)
Il sistema dell’arte contemporanea, Laterza  1999 (IX edition. 2008)
Gian Enzo Sperone. Torino, Roma, New York, Hopeful Monster, Turin,  2000
Dizionario dell’arte del Novecento (with Martina Corgnati), Bruno Mondadori, Milan, 2001 (pocket book 2009)
Arte Contemporanea. Le ricerche internazionali dagli anni Cinquanta a oggi, Electa, Milan, 2003 (IV ed. 2008)
La scultura del Novecento, Laterza, Rome, 2006.
Arte Moderna. Dal postimpressionismo all’informale, Electa, Milan, 2007
Felice Casorati: Art & Dossier, Giunti, Florence, 2007
Arte contemporanea, Arnoldo Mondatori Editore, Milan, 2007
L’arte del Novecento in Piemonte, Regione Piemonte, Priuli & Verlucca, Turin, 2008
Gli anni Cinquanta,  Arte Contemporanea, Electa, Milan, 2008

Curated exhibitions
"Standing Sculpture" (with Rudi Fuchs e Johnalbert Gachnang), Castello di Rivoli, Turin, 1988
"Il colore del lavoro" (with Claudia Gian Ferrari), Mole Antonelliana, Turin, toured to Palazzo Reale, Milano; Palazzo Gotico, Piacenza, 1990
"Pinot Gallizio nell’Europa dei dissimmetrici", Promotrice delle Belle Arti, Turin, 1992
"Persone", Italian Pavilion, XLV Venice Biennale, 1993
"Felice Casorati", Palazzo Bricherasio, Turin, 1996
XIII Rome Quadriennial, Palazzo delle Esposizioni, Rome, 1999
"Da Warhol al 2000: Gian Enzo Sperone 35 anni di mostre tra Europa e America", Palazzo Cavour, Turin, 2000
"Naif? Da Rousseau a Ligabue", Palazzo Bricherasio, Turin, 2002
"André Derain: La forma classica", Centro St. Benin, Aosta, e Museo della Permanente, Milan, 2003
"L’estetica della macchina: Da Balla al futurismo torinese"(con altri)", Palazzo Cavour, Turin, 2005
"Chronos: Il tempo nell’arte dall’età barocca a oggi", Ex-Filatoio, Caraglio, 2005
XIII Biennale Internazionale di Scultura di Carrara, 2008
"In-Finitum" (with Axel Vervoordt, Daniela Ferretti, Gian Domenico Romanelli), Palazzo Fortuny, Venice, 2009
"Alberto Burri", Palazzo Clemente Fondazione Menegaz, Borgo Medioevale di Castelbasso, 2009

References

External links
Articles  published in journal ARTKEY

Italian art historians
Italian art curators
Italian art critics
Writers from Turin
Living people
Academic staff of Brera Academy
1949 births